Under the Radar is the third studio album by Canadian singer-songwriter Daniel Powter and follows his 2005 self-titled second album. The album was released in September 2008 in Europe and was later released in North America in 2009. The song "Next Plane Home" was released as the first single of the album. It was followed by "Best of Me" and then "Whole World Around". This album also contains a new remix of "Love You Lately" which has a cleaner sound, extra keyboard/synthesizer effects, and some extra backing vocals as well as a re-recording of the song "Negative Fashion" which originally appeared on Powter's debut album "I'm Your Betty". In the UK, the album has debuted at number 43 and included an exclusive bonus track in the form of a live rendition of "Bad Day" in Vienna (This was also included on the Taiwan release).

The new remix of "Love You Lately" was re-released as a promo single in the US and received airplay in New England on AC charts.

Track listing

References 

2008 albums
Daniel Powter albums
Warner Records albums
Albums produced by Linda Perry